Danese may refer to:

 Danese, West Virginia
 Danese Cattaneo (1509–1572), Italian sculptor and medallist
 Danese Cooper (born 1959), American programmer and computer scientist and advocate of open source software
 Fabrizio Danese (born 1995), Italian footballer
 Michele Danese (born 1982), Italian motorcycle racer
 Shera Danese (born 1949), American actress
 Danese Milano, an Italian brand founded in the 1950s that manufactures designer homewares (now a subsidiary of Artemede)